The F. B. Watts Memorial Lectures, commonly known as the Watts Lectures, is a series of public lectures held at the University of Toronto Scarborough several times annually. It was established in 1970 and named after Fred Watts, a former professor of geography at the University of Toronto and founding member of the University of Toronto Scarborough, initially known as Scarborough College, who died a year before the inception of the lecture series. The series was inaugurated by Lester B. Pearson, former Prime Minister of Canada.

List of lecturers
 1970 — Lester B. Pearson, "Partners in Development"
 1971 — Noel Annan, Baron Annan, "What Is a University For Anyway?"
 1974 — Gerhard Herzberg, "Science & Society"
 1975 — Raymond Moriyama, "Can Your Life Become a Work of Art?"
 1976 — David Lewis (politician), "Corporate Power Today: The Image and the Reality"
 1978 — John Diefenbaker
 1981 — Mordecai Richler
 1982 — J. M. S. Careless
 1982 — Flora MacDonald (politician)
 1983 — Alfonso García Robles
 1983 — Hans Küng
 1984 — David Suzuki
 1985 — Stephen Lewis
 1986 — Bob White (trade unionist)
 1988 — Thomas R. Berger
 1990 — Edwin Mirvish
 1991 — Georges Erasmus
 1992 — Judy Rebick
 1993 — Major-General Lewis MacKenzie
 1994 — Abdullah Abdullah and Itzhak Shelef
 1995 — Roberta Bondar
 1999 — David Phillips
 2000 — Roberta Jamieson
 2001 — Mark Tewksbury
 2002 — Bob Rae
 2003 — Preston Manning
 2004 — Joe Schlesinger
 2005 — Dr. James Orbinski
 2005 — Dr. Sheela Basrur
 2011 — Roméo Dallaire
 2012 — David Suzuki
 2014 — Jane Goodall
 2019 - Beverley McLachlin

References

University of Toronto
Lecture series